Hillfoot railway station is a railway station in Bearsden, East Dunbartonshire near Glasgow, Scotland. The station is managed by ScotRail and is served by their trains on the Argyle and North Clyde Lines. It is sited between Milngavie and Bearsden,  from Glasgow Queen Street, measured via Maryhill.

History 
It was opened on 1 May 1900, after the Milngavie branch was double tracked.

Facilities

The station has a small car park but no ticket office or ticket machine. As there are no facilities to purchase tickets, passengers must buy one in advance, or from the guard on the train. Both platforms have shelters, help points and benches, and there are bike racks adjacent to platform 1. Both platforms have step-free entrances, but the footbridge only has steps.

Passenger volume 

The statistics cover twelve month periods that start in April.

Services

On weekdays and Saturdays, trains run every 30 minutes northbound to Milngavie, and southbound to Springburn, via Glasgow Queen Street (low level). In the evenings and on Sundays, trains run southbound to Motherwell, via Hamilton Central, at the same twice-hourly frequency.

Cultural references 
The station is used in the BBC comedy series Burnistoun.

References

External links

Video footage of Hillfoot Station on YouTube

Railway stations in East Dunbartonshire
Former North British Railway stations
Railway stations in Great Britain opened in 1900
SPT railway stations
Railway stations served by ScotRail